Heather Maxine Reisman  (born August 28, 1948) is a Canadian businesswoman and philanthropist. Reisman is the founder and chief executive of the Canadian retail chain Indigo Books and Music. She is the co-founder and past Chair of Kobo, and was appointed an Officer of the Order of Canada in 2019.

Early life and education 
Reisman was born in 1948 to a Jewish family in Montreal, Quebec and educated at McGill University where she received a Bachelor of Social Work degree.

Career 
Reisman was first employed in social work as a caseworker.
After her first marriage ended in divorce, she switched careers and joined her brother Howard’s company. In 1979, she co-founded Paradigm Consulting and served as the managing director of this strategic change consultancy until 1995.

In 1995, she was invited to become a "front-line investor" for Borders Group, which was planning to enter the Canadian market. When Borders was unable to obtain the necessary federal regulatory approval in Canada, Reisman founded a company called Indigo Books and Music. She raised $25m from a group of investors based on the original concept document for Indigo. In 2001, Indigo Books and Music acquired its main rival, Chapters, to form the largest book retailer in Canada, obtaining a clear leadership position in the book retailing industry. Reisman co-founded Kobo Inc. in 2009 and two years later, sold Indigo’s majority stake in Kobo to the Japanese company Rakuten for $315 million.

Since 1998, Reisman has also chosen more than 262 "Heather's Picks" for Indigo, which are books specifically recommended by her and come with a money-back guarantee.

Although Indigo has increasingly stocked giftware in its stores, Reisman said this in a 2018 interview about the company's core product: "Books were, are, and always will be the heart and soul of our business". She began expanding Indigo into the US in 2018, starting with the first store at Short Hills in New Jersey.

In 2009, she co-founded Kobo to participate in the exploding e-reading market. In 2012 Kobo was sold to Rakuten, and it remains a leader in the field.

Reisman has also served as a governor of the Toronto Stock Exchange and of McGill University. She has been a board member of several companies, including Williams Sonoma and J. Crew. She is currently a Director of Onex Corporation and Mt. Sinai Hospital.

In 2014, Reisman was executive producer of Fed Up along with Katie Couric, who also narrated the documentary, and producer Laurie David. Reisman was executive producer with David on The Social Dilemma in 2020. Reisman and David also authored a book together titled Imagine It! A Handbook for a Happier Planet (2021).

Advocacy and politics
In August 2006, due to differing reactions by the two main Canadian political parties to the 2006 Lebanon War, Reisman withdrew her longtime support for the Liberal Party of Canada and chose to support the Conservative Party of Canada under Stephen Harper.

Mein Kampf
She drew praise and criticism in October 2001, after announcing that Indigo would not sell Hitler's Mein Kampf in its bookstores.

Death penalty for Sakineh Ashtiani 
On July 5, 2010, Reisman launched an online petition to save an Iranian woman, Sakineh Ashtiani, from the death penalty by stoning. Her initiative found support around the world. Sakineh was not subjected to the stoning.

Bilderberg Group 
Reisman is a member of the Steering Committee of the Bilderberg Group, and participated in all its conferences between 2002 and 2017.

Philanthropy
In 2006, Reisman founded the Indigo Love of Reading Foundation, whose mission is to enrich the libraries in under-resourced public schools. Since its inception, the group has donated millions of books to over 3,000 Canadian public elementary school libraries.

In 2005, she and her husband Gerald Schwartz founded the HESEG Foundation, which provides scholarships to "lone soldiers", individuals who have served their time in the Israeli military and who do not have immediate family in Israel.

Mount Sinai Hospital announced in December 2013 that a transformational $15 million gift from Reisman and Schwartz would be used to "reshape emergency medicine" at the facility.

The Gerald Schwartz and Heather Reisman Foundation donated $5.3 million to St. Francis Xavier University in Antigonish, Nova Scotia in late 2018 to create scholarships, bursaries and increased recruitment of business students.

In March 2019, University of Toronto announced that Schwartz and Reisman were giving the university $100 million to build a 750,000-square foot innovation centre, through The Gerald Schwartz & Heather Reisman Foundation. According to Reisman, the Schwartz Reisman Innovation Centre will be used to improve technology, particularly Artificial intelligence, and how the public can relate to it. One of the two towers will house the Schwartz Reisman Institute for Technology and Society and the Vector Institute for Artificial Intelligence while the other will include labs for research in regenerative medicine, genetics and precision medicine.

Awards 
In May 2015, Reisman was inducted into the Canadian Business Hall of Fame.

Reisman is the recipient of honorary doctorates from Ryerson University (2006), Wilfrid Laurier University (2009), Mount Allison University (2010), St. Francis Xavier University (2013), and University of Manitoba (2016) McGill University (2017), Weizmann Institute of Science (2017), and University of Toronto (2021).

She was named Retail Council of Canada's Distinguished Retailer of the Year (2011), and received the International Distinguished Entrepreneur Award (2003) from the University of Manitoba, Asper Business School.

She is an Officer of the Order of Canada.

In 2009, the Financial Times listed Reisman as one of the top 50 businesswomen in the world.

Reisman was also included in the Women's Executive Network's Top 100 Most Powerful Women.

In 2022, she was inducted into Canada's Walk of Fame in Toronto as "Canada’s Most Recognized Literacy Advocate".

Personal life
Her father, Mark, was a real estate developer; her mother, Rose, owned a clothing store; and her brother, Howard, founded computer company Time Systems. She is the niece of Simon Reisman.

Reisman was married earlier in her life but divorced her first husband. In 1982, she married Gerald Schwartz, the founder and CEO of Onex Corporation. Reisman has four children and nine grandchildren. Two of the children are from her first marriage and two are step-children from her marriage to Schwartz. The couple are members of the Reform synagogue, Holy Blossom Temple in Toronto.

See also 
 List of Bilderberg participants
List of Companions of the Order of Canada

References

1948 births
Living people
Businesspeople from Montreal
Businesspeople from Toronto
Canadian drink industry businesspeople
Canadian billionaires
Canadian book publishers (people)
Canadian chief executives
Canadian consultants
Canadian Reform Jews
Canadian social workers
Canadian women business executives
Indigo Books and Music people
Members of the Steering Committee of the Bilderberg Group
McGill University School of Social Work alumni
Canadian women company founders
Directors of Onex Corporation
Officers of the Order of Canada